Myrhorod  is an air base of the Ukrainian Air Force located near Myrhorod, Poltava Oblast, Ukraine.

The base is home to the 831st Tactical Aviation Brigade flying Sukhoi Su-27P/UB aircraft.

History 
In May 1944 the airfield was provided to the United States Army Air Forces as a heavy bomber staging field. It was used by the Eighth and Fifteenth Air Forces for shuttle bombing missions during June through September 1944 (Operation Frantic).

Myrhorod was designated as USAAF Station 561 for security purposes and was referred to as Station 561 in all messages and written correspondence. Myrhorod was one of three Ukraine installations operated by Headquarters, Eastern Command, United States Strategic Air Forces. The others were nearby  Poltava, where USAAF Eastern Command Headquarters was located, and Pyriatyn.

Aircraft would land at the field from either Great Britain or Southern Italy after attacking Axis targets in Eastern Europe.  The aircraft would refuel and rearm at the airport, then attack other targets on return missions to Southern Italy.

Shuttle bombing operations under Operation Frantic ended in September 1944, and the Americans consolidated operations at Poltava for the remainder of the war.

On the night of 21 June 1944, the field was targeted by a massive German strike force. Unable to find Myrhorod, this force augmented the bombers attacking Poltava. The next night, however, the Germans bombed Myrhorod. By then, flyable aircraft had been evacuated from the field, and the losses were confined to fuel and ammunition stores.

After the war, the airfield was rebuilt and used as a Soviet Air Forces base.  Dispersal hardstands were attached to each end of a new single runway, expanded for jet aircraft use, along with a large aircraft parking ramp, with at least six hangars.

The 831st Fighter Aviation Regiment (138th Fighter Aviation Division) arrived at the base in 1977, transferred from Boryspil in Kyiv Oblast.

Aircraft
Accroding to Google Earth imagery, as of March 20, 2020
 27 Sukhoi Su-27
 4 L-39 Albatros

References 

 Anderson, Barry, (1985), United States Air Forces Stations, Air Force Historical Research Center, Maxwell Air Force Base, Alabama.

Poltava Oblast
Airports in Ukraine
Ukrainian airbases
Buildings and structures in Poltava Oblast
Soviet Air Force bases
Soviet Air Defence Force bases